Saica is a genus of assassin bugs in the family Reduviidae. There are at least three described species in Saica.

Species
These three species belong to the genus Saica:
 Saica apicalis Osborn and Drake, 1915 i c g
 Saica elkinsi Blinn, 1994 i c g b
 Saica recurvata (Fabricius, 1803) i c g
Data sources: i = ITIS, c = Catalogue of Life, g = GBIF, b = Bugguide.net

References

Further reading

 
 
 

Reduviidae
Articles created by Qbugbot